The HPP Open is a professional tennis tournament played on indoor hard courts. It is currently part of the ATP Challenger Tour. It is held annually in Helsinki, Finland since 2019.

Past finals

Singles

Doubles

References

2019 establishments in Finland
Recurring sporting events established in 2019
ATP Challenger Tour
Hard court tennis tournaments
Tennis tournaments in Finland
International sports competitions in Helsinki